Forrest Oliver Fezler (September 23, 1949 – December 21, 2018) was an American golf course design consultant and PGA Tour professional golfer. His most prosperous year as a professional came in 1974, when he won the Southern Open and finished in second place to Hale Irwin at the U.S. Open, his best finish at a major.

Early years
Fezler was born in Hayward, California. He first showed an interest in the game of golf as a 7-year-old boy growing up in San Jose, California by drawing golf holes. As a youth, he would sneak onto the course at the San Jose Country Club to practice. He attended James Lick High School and was a member of the golf team; and a teammate of future fellow PGA Tour player Roger Maltbie. Fezler attended San Jose City College from 1968–1969. Fezler won the California State Amateur, Santa Clara County Championship and the California State Community College Championship in 1969.

PGA Tour
Fezler played on the PGA Tour from 1972 to 1983, and won one event. He had 30 top-10 finishes including eight runner-up finishes. He won the PGA Rookie of the Year award in 1973. His career year was 1974 when he won the Southern Open and finished in 2nd place to Hale Irwin at the U.S. Open. This was his best finish in a major championship. In 1976, Fezler tore the tendons in his left wrist and was forced to make major adjustments in his game – both in the number of tournaments he played and in his swing. He would limit his full-time professional play in 1983, and in 1984 took the head club pro job at Blackhawk Country Club in the East Bay region of California. He earned $527,000 in career winnings.

Dress code protest
Fezler was unhappy with the PGA Tour's dress code that required players to wear slacks. At the 1983 U.S. Open, which is run by the USGA, Fezler was goaded by a reporter to wear shorts in protest the next day during the tournament. Before playing the last hole of the last round, he stepped into a portable toilet and changed into shorts, then left the course to avoid possible admonishment by the USGA.

Golf course design
In 1994, Fezler changed careers and got into the golf course design and construction business as a partner with South Carolina-based Mike Strantz, an award-winning former associate of Tom Fazio. He developed his own golf course, which he called Golden Eagle, in Tallahassee, Florida.

Death
Fezler died on December 21, 2018 at age 69. According to his son, Jordan, he had been battling brain cancer.

Amateur wins (3)
1969 Santa Clara County Championship, California State Amateur, California Community College Championship

Professional wins (2)

PGA Tour wins (1)

PGA Tour playoff record (0–1)

Other wins (1)
1975 Confidence Open

Results in major championships

CUT = missed the half-way cut
WD = withdrew
"T" = tied

See also 

 1971 PGA Tour Qualifying School graduates

References

External links

American male golfers
PGA Tour golfers
Golf course architects
Golfers from California
Golfers from Tallahassee, Florida
Sportspeople from San Jose, California
Sportspeople from Hayward, California
Deaths from brain cancer in the United States
1949 births
2018 deaths